Preda V. Mihăilescu (born 23 May 1955) is a Romanian mathematician, best known for his proof of the 158-year-old Catalan's conjecture.

Biography
Born in Bucharest, he is the brother of Vintilă Mihăilescu.

After leaving Romania in 1973, he settled in Switzerland.  He studied mathematics and computer science in Zürich, receiving a PhD from ETH Zürich in 1997. His PhD thesis, titled Cyclotomy of rings and primality testing, was written under the direction of Erwin Engeler and Hendrik Lenstra.

For several years, he did research at the University of Paderborn, Germany. Since 2005, he has held a professorship at the University of Göttingen.

Major research
In 2002, Mihăilescu proved Catalan's conjecture. This number-theoretical conjecture, formulated by the French and Belgian mathematician Eugène Charles Catalan in 1844, had stood unresolved for 158 years. Mihăilescu's proof appeared in Crelle's Journal in 2004.

Notes

References

External links

Web page at Göttingen
Former Web page at Paderborn (no longer updated)
 

1955 births
Living people
20th-century Romanian mathematicians
21st-century Romanian mathematicians
Number theorists
21st-century German mathematicians
Academic staff of the University of Göttingen
ETH Zurich alumni
Scientists from Bucharest
Romanian emigrants to Switzerland